"Dil Diyan Gallan" may refer to:

 Dil Diyan Gallan, 2018 Pakistani drama on Hum TV
 Dil Diyan Gallan, song from 2017 film Tiger Zinda Hai by Atif Aslam
 Dil Diyaan Gallaan, a 2022 Indian television series